Pehlivan or Pahlevan derives from Iranian language word meaning noble, wrestler, hero or champion and it is a loan word in many Asiatic languages as well as middle eastern languages including Turkish surname originally given to wrestlers. The name of Feyli (Pehli) Kurds is also deriving from the same root word. The word consist of two Iranic (Aryen) word "pehli" or "pahli" and "van, wan". While peh, pah is root word for hero "van" or "wan" is a suffix similar as in "er, or" in soldier, warrior, wrestler, shopper.

Notable people with this surname include:
 Barış Pehlivan (born 1983), Turkish journalist
 Ferhat Pehlivan (born 1988), Turkish boxer
 Halil Pehlivan (born 1994), Turkish footballer
 Kurtdereli Mehmet Pehlivan (born 1864), Turkish wrestler
 Yasin Pehlivan (born 1989), Turkish Austrian footballer

See also
 Pehlivan (disambiguation)

References